Hashibur Rahman Swapon (16 May 1954 – 2 September 2021) was a Bangladesh Awami League politician who served as Jatiya Sangsad member from the Sirajganj-6 and Sirajganj-7 constituencies.

Early life and education
Swapon was born on 16 June 1954, in Dwariyapur in Shahjadpur upazila of Sirajganj district. Swapon had studied up to H.S.C. or grade 12.

Career
Swapon was first elected to Jatiya Sangsad as a member of the Bangladesh Nationalist Party representing the now-defunct Sirajganj-7 constituency. He lost the position when he switched to Awami League party in 1998.

Swapon was later elected to the parliament from Sirajganj-6 on 5 January 2014 as an Awami League candidate. He was warned  on 24 December 2015 by Bangladesh Election Commission for violating the electoral code. He was a member of the Parliamentary Standing Committee on Food Ministry.

Death 
Swapon died from COVID-19 at a hospital in Turkey on 2 September 2021.

References 

1954 births
2021 deaths
People from Sirajganj District
Bangladesh Nationalist Party politicians
Awami League politicians
7th Jatiya Sangsad members
10th Jatiya Sangsad members
11th Jatiya Sangsad members
Deaths from the COVID-19 pandemic in Turkey